Yagotinskaya is a rural locality (a station) in Yagotinsky Selsoviet, Blagoveshchensky District, Altai Krai, Russia. The population was 26 as of 2013. There is 1 street.

Geography 
Yagotinskaya is located 29 km southwest of Blagoveshchenka (the district's administrative centre) by road. Yagotino  is the nearest rural locality.

References 

Rural localities in Blagoveshchensky District, Altai Krai